Francesca Bortolozzi (born 4 May 1968) is an Italian former fencer. She won two gold medals and a silver in the women's team foil events between 1988 and 1996. She is married to Andrea Borella, who was also an Olympic fencing champion for Italy.

References

External links
 

1968 births
Living people
Italian female fencers
Olympic fencers of Italy
Fencers at the 1988 Summer Olympics
Fencers at the 1992 Summer Olympics
Fencers at the 1996 Summer Olympics
Olympic gold medalists for Italy
Olympic silver medalists for Italy
Olympic medalists in fencing
Sportspeople from Padua
Medalists at the 1988 Summer Olympics
Medalists at the 1992 Summer Olympics
Medalists at the 1996 Summer Olympics
20th-century Italian women
21st-century Italian women